Jerzy Sandera (born September 3, 1972 in Nowy Sącz) is a Polish slalom canoer who competed from the early 1990s to the early 2000s. He finished 27th in the K-1 event at the 1996 Summer Olympics in Atlanta.

References
Sports-Reference.com profile

External links

1972 births
Canoeists at the 1996 Summer Olympics
Living people
Olympic canoeists of Poland
Polish male canoeists
Sportspeople from Nowy Sącz